Jedburgh Public Hall known as Jedburgh Town Hall is a listed building in the centre of Jedburgh opposite the ruins of Jedburgh Abbey. It was opened in 1900 as the town's principal public building. An information centre is attached and it overlooks a large car park which is beside the A68.

History
The current building dates from 1900 and it was designed by James Pearson Alison. This was the same year as Jedburgh Library was opened. It was built on the foundations of a previous building and basement rooms are from that former use as a malt barn. These rooms had been used as the town armoury. The town needed a public building as the Corn Exchange, which had stood in the market place, burnt down in 1898.

The new public building was used as a drill hall during the first world war. The hall was used by "C" Squadron of the Lothians and Border Horse and for "A" Company of the 4th battalion of the King's Own Scottish Borderers. In 1918 it was a scene of celebration when war hero John Daykins VC was honoured at the hall.

The novelist, playwright and creator of Peter Pan, J. M. Barrie, visited the town hall when he became a freeman of the town on 15 October 1928.

It was at the town hall that, in a by-election in March 1965, the future leader of the Liberal Democrats, David Steel, was declared elected, aged just 25, as the youngest Member of Parliament in the UK House of Commons.

In 1975 an information centre was attached and the hall became a class B listed building on 23 March 1993.

The hall was run and owned by the local council but in 2015 the costs of ownership became onerous and it and the management of many other public buildings in the borders were transferred to a trust. The building was available to let and it is the location for the local flower show, birl'n'beer and music evenings.

In early 2020 it was proposed that the hall might be sold, but a petition caused the council to pause the proposed closures. Then, in September 2020, the council reported that it was considering proposals, submitted by a community group known as "Jedburgh Legacy Group", to take over the management of some of Jedburgh's historic buildings.

See also
 List of listed buildings in Jedburgh, Scottish Borders

References

Category B listed buildings in the Scottish Borders
Jedburgh
City chambers and town halls in Scotland
Government buildings completed in 1901
Listed government buildings in Scotland